Yuvraj Singh (born 22 August 1998) is an Indian cricketer who plays for Railways. Singh was a former captain of the under-19 team, before being selected to play for the senior team. He made his Twenty20 debut on 18 January 2021, for Railways in the 2020–21 Syed Mushtaq Ali Trophy. He made his first-class debut on 17 February 2022, for Railways in the 2021–22 Ranji Trophy, were he took a five-wicket haul.

References

External links
 

1998 births
Living people
Indian cricketers
Railways cricketers
Place of birth missing (living people)